John Joseph Fleming (born 1 July 1953) is an English former footballer who played 199 league games in the Football League in a ten-year professional career throughout the 1970s. He later became a player and coach in Australia.

He began his playing career at Oxford United in 1971, making 75 league appearances in a four-year spell at the club. He spent 1975 to 1980 at Lincoln City, making over 100 appearances for the club. He won the Fourth Division title with the "Imps" in 1975–76. Loaned out to Port Vale in 1980, he emigrated to Australia and signed with Wollongong City. He retired as a player in 1986, and later coached Wollongong Olympic, Kemblawarra (in two spells), Port Kembla, and Wollongong United.

Playing career
Fleming began his career at Oxford United, who finished 15th in the Second Division in 1971–72 under the stewardship of Gerry Summers. They rose up to eighth in 1972–73, before finishing just two points and two places above the relegation zone in 1973–74. The "U's" finished 11th in 1974–75. Fleming scored two goals in 75 league games during his spell at the Manor Ground. He then transferred to Graham Taylor's Lincoln City, who won the Fourth Division title in 1975–76. The "Imps" then consolidated their Third Division status with a ninth-place finish in 1976–77. They then dropped down to 16th place in 1977–78 under George Kerr and Willie Bell's stewardship. However they struggled under new boss Colin Murphy, and Fleming scored six goals in the 1978–79 relegation season, enough to make him the club's joint top-scorer (along with Glenn Cockerill, Mick Harford, and Gordon Hobson). He was sent on loan to John McGrath's Port Vale in March 1980. His debut game for the "Valiants" came against parent club Lincoln on 15 March; the Vale lost 3–0. He played just a further two games, having failed to impress at Vale Park. He left Sincil Bank at the end of 1979–80 season, having scored 18 goals in 141 league and cup games at the club. Fleming joined Wollongong City in the Australian National Soccer League where he spent the next six years, amassing over a hundred appearances. City finished 11th in 1981, third in 1982, 15th in 1983, 12th (of 12) in the Northern Conference in 1984, tenth in 1985, and eighth in 1986.

Coaching career
In July 1998, he was sacked as coach of Wollongong Olympic despite the club standing in equal fifth place of the league and also being and a semi-finalist in the Bampton Cup.

A week after departing Olympic, Fleming was appointed coach of Kemblawarra taking over from Joe Coelho, who had been acting as player-coach since the sacking of Jim Dafkovski. He departed the club at the end of the 2003 season.

After a year away, Fleming returned to Kemblawarra as coach for the 2005 season, replacing player-coach Richard Lloyd who would miss the season due to work commitments in Canada. However, his second spell at the helm would be short-lived as, at the end of August 2005, he resigned from the club after a dispute over the club's handling of a training ground disciplinary incident involving a youth grade player.

In April 2006, he succeeded the sacked Harry Sattin as coach of Port Kembla. He was sacked in May 2009.

In November 2009, he became coach of Wollongong United. He "walked out on the club" in May 2012 after falling out with president Peter Vrtkovski.

Career statistics
Source:

Honours
Lincoln City
Football League Fourth Division: 1975–76

References

1953 births
Living people
Footballers from Nottingham
English footballers
Association football midfielders
Oxford United F.C. players
Lincoln City F.C. players
Port Vale F.C. players
Wollongong Wolves FC players
English Football League players
National Soccer League (Australia) players
English football managers
English expatriates in Australia